Doha 2006 is a maxi-catamaran, that has participated in many offshore races under several names:  

 Club Med, skippered by Grant Dalton, for The Race,
 Maiden 2, skippered by Tracy Edwards and Brian Thompson,
 Doha 2006, skippered by Brian Thompson for the Oryx Quest.

It is the sister-ship of Gitana 13, winner of the Jules Verne Trophy with Bruno Peyron.

Records 
 Under the name Club Med in 2000 : Winner of The Race.
 Under the names  Club Med or Maiden 2 3 times between 2000 and 2002 : Winner of the 24 hours distance record, with, in 2002, . 
 Under the name Doha 2006 in 2004 : Winner of the Oryx Quest.

References 

Individual catamarans
Individual sailing vessels
2000s sailing yachts
Sailing yachts built in France
Sailing yachts designed by Gilles Ollier
The Race yachts
Oryx Quest yachts